Vincenzo Magliocco (1 January 1893 – 27 June 1936) was a Sicilian general and aviator of the Italian Royal Air Force and former soldier of the Royal Italian Army.

Biography 
Magliocco was born on 1 January 1893 in Palermo, Italy. He would study in his home town and achieve a degree in legal theory.

In 1915 Magliocco enlisted in the Royal Italian Army as an artillery officer, joining the 29th Field Artillery Regiment. Later that year he was promoted to Sub-lieutenant, and would join a mountain artillery unit stationed on the Col di Lana, with whom he would fight during the outbreak of World War I.

Due to his merits in the war, Magliocco was promoted to Lieutenant in 1917, and, upon his request, was sent to Rome where he studied aviation in Centocelle for three months. He would return to combat in May as an "Airplane Observer," and earn one Bronze and two Silver Medals of Military Valor.

In June of 1923, Magliocco was promoted to Captain and assigned to a Reconnaissance Aviation Center stationed in Parma. In November of that year, he would join the Regia Aeronautica, the newly established Italian Royal Air Force. He would later be promoted to lieutenant colonel in 1929, and later, in 1932, he became a colonel.

In 1934 Magliocco, a fascist supporter, was sent by the Italian government to Italian East Africa to manage air bases in the colony due to worsening relations with the Ethiopian Empire. 

While there, Magliocco became a close collaborator of General Rodolfo Graziani who would elevate him to the rank of brigadier general and make him a knight of the Military Order of Savoy. His role during the Second Italo-Ethiopian War, would become infamous for his use of mustard gas against the Ethiopians.

Death 
On 26 June 1936 Magliocco, serving as Deputy Chief of the Italian Royal Air Force and Deputy Viceroy of Italian Ethiopia, flew out of the airbase at Addis Ababa, leading two Caproni Ca.133 bombers and a IMAM Ro.1 reconnaissance aircraft, in order to meet with local leaders at Lechemti. The squadron, which contained thirteen Italian officials, including the general, was charged with ensuring the loyalty of the town.

After landing the Italians set up camp around the aircraft, but were then ambushed on the night of 27 June 1936 by the Arbegnoch, Ethiopian guerilla fighters while in the Welega district. Magliocco died alongside the other members of the squadron, which included Antonio Locatelli. The only survivor of the Italian representatives was Father Borello, a catholic priest who joined them to serve as a guide.

Following what would become known as the "Lechemti Massacre," a retaliatory bombing campaign of the area for these losses, several of the men who died were posthumously awarded the Gold Medal of Military Valour, including Vincenzo Magliocco.

Legacy 
The Caproni Ca.133 bombers were burned in the aftermath of the attack. The next day it was decided that one of the bombers would be converted to serve as a war memorial for the fallen men.

In the same year of Magliocco's death, 1936, the Magliocco Aerodromo was dedicated and named in his honor as the first Sicilian to become a general officer in the Italian Air Force. It would serve as a major airfield during WWII until allied bombing rendered it unusable. The airport would be renamed on 7 June 2014 after Pio La Torre.

There are also streets in Palermo and Milan named after Magliocco that have drawn criticism due to his support of fascism.

References 

1893 births
1936 deaths
Military personnel from Palermo
Italian military personnel of World War I
Military aviators
Italian fascists
Italian military personnel of the Second Italo-Ethiopian War
Italian Air Force generals
Brigadier generals
Recipients of the Bronze Medal of Military Valor
Recipients of the Silver Medal of Military Valor
Recipients of the Gold Medal of Military Valor
Knights of the Military Order of Savoy